Masthope Mountain Community  is a census-designated place located in Lackawaxen Township, Pike County in the state of Pennsylvania.  The community is located in far northeastern Pike County near the New York border.  As of the 2010 census the population was 685.

Masthope is a name derived from a Native American language purported to mean "beads of glass".

It is a private community of single family homes in the most northern tier of the Poconos Mountains.  The community has a lodge, built in 2005, which has a restaurant overlooking the Delaware River, as well as a ski area, horse stables, a fitness center, and a beach.

External links
Community website

References

Census-designated places in Pike County, Pennsylvania
Census-designated places in Pennsylvania
Planned residential developments